The One Big Union (OBU) was a Canadian syndicalist trade union active primarily in the western part of the country. It was initiated formally in Calgary on June 4, 1919, but lost most of its members by 1922. It finally merged into the Canadian Labour Congress in 1956.

Background 
Towards the end of World War I, labor activism in Western Canada became more radical. Western Canadian radicals protested the management of the Trades and Labour Congress of Canada (TLC), the American Federation of Labor (AFL) and the governments in power. Western unions were represented by only 45 of 400 delegates at the September 1918 TLC convention. Their resolutions to condemn Canada's efforts for World War I were defeated easily. Moreover, the socialist TLC president James Watters, who had had this post since 1911, was replaced by the conservative Tom Moore.

In those radical times, the federal government clamped down on radical publications and organizations, outlawing 14 different organizations including the Industrial Workers of the World (the IWW). But labour activists and socialists did not allow the vision of that kind of society to die so determined to establish a new organization with the old IWW motto "The Workers of the World Unite" as their stated belief.

Western TLC unionists met annually in what became known as the Western Labor Conferences. The 1919 event was held on March 13, prior to the annual national TLC congress. The WLC conference was dominated by members of the Socialist Party of Canada, who favored secession from the TLC. The majority at the conference voted to form a new "revolutionary industrial union" separate from the AFL/TLC, to be initiated officially at a convention scheduled for June 11. The conference also approved resolutions condemning the Canadian government's practices during the war and expressing solidarity with the Bolsheviks in Russia and the Spartacist League in Germany. It was also decided to poll Canadian workers on a general strike.

Rise 

The general strike that began in Winnipeg on May 15 was in large part inspired by the One Big Union's ideals. many One Big Union leader including Robert B. Russell, were arrested in conjunction with the strike, Russell being sentenced to two years imprisonment. Edmonton, Calgary, Drumheller and Vancouver began their own general strikes, spurred on by Winnipeg. Most strikeleaders, such as Edmonton's Joe Knight,  Calgary's Mrs. Jean MacWilliams, and Amherst's Frank Burke were OBU affiliates. A.S Wells, leader of the BC Federation of Labour at the time, was a founding member of the OBU.

The AFL and the TLC resisted the secession, by what would soon become the OBU. OBU members and OBU unions were expelled from most local trades councils. Nonetheless, thousands of workers resigned the AFL and the TLC and joined the OBU. These included loggers, hard rock miners, coal miners, longshoremen, construction workers, metalworkers, shop craft workers, etc. The One Big Union organized by industry rather than by trade, in response to a deemphasis of craftsmanship, (Taylorism), and the burgeoning demand for unskilled labour. The OBU's anti-capitalist policy was evident by its constitution's pre-amble:

By late 1919 the OBU's membership was 70,000. Although primarily organized in western Canada, the OBU had a significant presence in Nova Scotia, organizing coal workers during the Cape Breton Labour War, and covered nearly all of Amherst's workers.

Fall 
The union's maximum was attained during late 1919 or early 1920. Due to persecution by employers, the media, government and even other unions, membership decreased. Employers refused to bargain with the OBU's representatives, and OBU organizers were beaten, kidnapped and dismissed from coalfields. By 1921, it had only approximately 5,000 members and by 1927 only 1,600, almost all in Winnipeg. By 1922, most of the union's income came from a lottery it operated in its weekly bulletin. At the time lotteries were illegal in Canada, but it took the authorities years to successfully prosecute the union. The bulletin had a large circulation because of the lottery; even many businessmen bought it for the lottery coupons.

During the late 1920s the OBU briefly joined the All-Canadian Congress of Labour and considered joining the Canadian Congress of Labour during World War II, but by then its members were almost all employees of the Winnipeg Transit System. The One Big Union, by then with 24,000 members, merged into the Canadian Labour Congress during 1956.

References

Further reading 

Canada in the World Wars and Interwar Years
Canadian Labour Congress
Defunct trade unions in Canada
Economy of Winnipeg
 
Organizations based in Winnipeg
Trade unions established in 1919
Trade unions disestablished in 1956
Syndicalism
Syndicalist trade unions